The Nickel Centre Native Sons were a Junior "A" ice hockey team from Garson, Ontario, Canada.  This defunct hockey team was a part of the Northern Ontario Junior Hockey League

History
The Native Sons originated in the NOHA Jr. B League.  In their time in the league, Nickel Centre won two McNamara Cups as league champions, 1979 and 1987.  In 1987, the team did something that no other NOJHL team was able to do.  After winning the NOJHL, the Power Trains took on the Ontario Provincial Junior A Hockey League Champion Owen Sound Greys for the right to play for the Dudley Hewitt Cup.  Nickel Centre pulled off a massive upset and beat the Grey 4-games-to-2.  In 8 years, the NOJHL and Old OPJHL competed for the Ontario Hockey Association title 7 times, and 1987 was the only ever time the NOJHL won.  The next season, the Old OPJHL disbanded and left the NOJHL to battle it out with Thunder Bay for Ontario's seed in the Centennial Cup.  The Pembroke Lumber Kings of the Central Junior A Hockey League ended up winning the Dudley to earn the birth into the National Championship.

Season-by-season results

Defunct ice hockey teams in Canada
Sports teams in Greater Sudbury
Northern Ontario Junior Hockey League teams